Eslamabad (also Romanized as Eslāmābād) is a village in Howmeh Rural District, in the Central District of Borujen County, Chaharmahal and Bakhtiari Province, Iran. At the 2006 census, its population was 789, in 174 families.

References 

Populated places in Borujen County